Pinegar is a surname. Notable people with the surname include:

Ed J. Pinegar (1935–2020), American author, educator and leader
Patricia P. Pinegar (born 1937), American Mormon leader